Thailand competed at the 2004 Summer Olympics in Athens, Greece, from 13 to 29 August 2004. This was the nation's thirteenth appearance at the Olympics, except the 1980 Summer Olympics in Moscow because of its partial support to the United States boycott.

The National Olympic Committee of Thailand sent a total of 42 athletes to the Games, 24 men and 18 women, to compete in 13 sports; the nation's team size was roughly smaller from Sydney by ten athletes. Fourteen of them had previously competed in Sydney, including featherweight boxer and 1996 Olympic champion Somluck Kamsing, and Asia's top tennis star Paradorn Srichaphan, who was later appointed by the committee to carry the Thai flag in the opening ceremony. Along with Kamsing, US-based swimmer Ratapong Sirisanont and badminton player Pramote Teerawiwatana became the first Thai athletes to compete in four Olympic Games. Among the sports played by athletes at these Games, Thailand marked its debut in equestrian and taekwondo.

Thailand left Athens with a total of eight medals (three golds, one silver, and four bronze), setting a historic milestone as the nation's most successful Games in Olympic history. Thai athletes continued to dominate in boxing and weightlifting, where they each won more than two Olympic medals, including a prestigious gold from Manus Boonjumnong in light welterweight boxing, and Udomporn Polsak, and Pawina Thongsuk in women's weightlifting.

Medalists

Athletics

Thai athletes have so far achieved qualifying standards in the following athletics events (up to a maximum of 3 athletes in each event at the 'A' Standard, and 1 at the 'B' Standard).

Women
Track & road events

Field events

Badminton

Men

Women

Mixed

Boxing

Thailand sent six boxers to Athens.

Equestrian

Eventing

Fencing

Men

Rowing

Thai rowers qualified the following boats:

Women

Qualification Legend: FA=Final A (medal); FB=Final B (non-medal); FC=Final C (non-medal); FD=Final D (non-medal); FE=Final E (non-medal); FF=Final F (non-medal); SA/B=Semifinals A/B; SC/D=Semifinals C/D; SE/F=Semifinals E/F; R=Repechage

Sailing

Thai sailors have qualified one boat for each of the following events.

Men

M = Medal race; OCS = On course side of the starting line; DSQ = Disqualified; DNF = Did not finish; DNS= Did not start; RDG = Redress given

Shooting

Two Thai shooters qualified to compete in the following events:

Men

Swimming

Thai swimmers earned qualifying standards in the following events (up to a maximum of 2 swimmers in each event at the A-standard time, and 1 at the B-standard time):

Men

Women

Table tennis

Thailand has qualified a single table tennis player.

Taekwondo

Four Thai taekwondo jin qualified for the following events.

Tennis

Thailand nominated a male and a female tennis player to compete in the tournament.

Weightlifting 

Five Thai weightlifters qualified for the following events:

See also
 Thailand at the 2002 Asian Games
 Thailand at the 2004 Summer Paralympics

References

External links
Official Report of the XXVIII Olympiad
Thailand Olympic Committee 

Nations at the 2004 Summer Olympics
2004
Summer Olympics